John Webber (1841 – 12 March 1904) was an Australian politician. He was a member of  the Queensland Legislative Council.

Early life 
Webber was born in Kingsbrompton, Somerset, in 1841 to Thomas Webber and his wife Ann (née Burston). Webber married Henrietta Wells, in 1869 at Wanganella, New South Wales.

Politics 
Webber was a member of the Bulloo Divisional Board, the Rabbit Board, and from May 1899 till his death a member of the Queensland Legislative Council.

Later life 
Webber died on 12 March 1904 at St Helen's Private Hospital in Brisbane, following a long illness.., and was buried in Toowong Cemetery but later exhumed for burial in Thargomindah with his wife.

References

Members of the Queensland Legislative Council
1841 births
1904 deaths
Burials at Toowong Cemetery
19th-century Australian politicians